Boyd Q.C. is a British legal television programme transmitted from December 1956 to September 1964 by the ITV franchise holder Associated-Rediffusion. It focused around a barrister in a London courtroom and the cases in which he was involved. It ran for seven series in total.

Cast
 Michael Denison – Richard Boyd Q.C. 
 Russell Waters – Albert
 Charles Leno – Narrator

Archival status
Most of the series has been lost. Of the eighty episodes produced, only five episodes survive as recordings, while five others survive incomplete.

In March 2022, "Sunday's Child", a missing episode from the fifth series, turned up on an eBay auction and sold for £310. It is unknown who the successful bidder was, or if the episode is being negotiated for return to the archives.

References

1956 British television series debuts
1964 British television series endings
1950s British drama television series
1960s British drama television series
British drama television series
ITV television dramas
Lost television shows
Television shows produced by Associated-Rediffusion
Black-and-white British television shows
English-language television shows